Note-oriety is an upper voices a cappella singing group at James Madison University in the United States, founded in 1998 by Kelly Myer and Bonnie Estes. The group sings in and around Harrisonburg, Virginia, tours the east coast and other parts of the United States. Note-oriety is best known for the viral video of their cover version of Beyoncé's song "Pretty Hurts". The group has been featured in USA Today, The Huffington Post, and BuzzFeed, and the group has been praised by Nicki Minaj, TLC, and Kelly Clarkson. They have also been nominated for and received several awards from international organizations, notably, the Contemporary A Cappella Society and the Recorded A Cappella Review Board. Note-oriety has performed all over the country, including The White House, the Lincoln Center, and Michelle Obama and Oprah Winfrey's United State of Women Summit.

History 
Note-oriety was founded in 1998 by Kelly Myer and Bonnie Estes as a sister group to the premier a Cappella group at JMU, The Madison Project. It is the first all-female group at James Madison University. The student-run musical group performs in and around Harrisonburg, Virginia and up and down the East Coast of the United States. In addition to various gigs, Note-oriety holds a concert once per semester, typically at the end of each semester. Additionally, they go on tour approximately bi-yearly.

Note-oriety has competed in several competitions throughout the years. In 2012, they won "Best Choreography" at SingStrong Aca Idol. In 2013, they won 1st place at the SingStrong Aca Idol Competition as well as winning "Audience Favorite". Note-oriety has also competed in the International Championship of Collegiate A Cappella, most recently in 2019, where they placed third.

Throughout their 20 years, Note-oriety has released several studio albums and singles. In 2015, they released their self-titled album Note-oriety. The album was nominated for numerous awards and was selected as the Recorded A Cappella Review Board's 2015 Album of the Year. The group has been nominated for several CARA awards through the years, most recently winning "Best Song" in the Collegiate Female category for "Bang Bang" on Note-oriety. The music video for "Pretty Hurts" from this album garnered over half a million views. The video went viral after it was released, and was praised by Nicki Minaj. Note-oriety's eighth album, titled XX in honor of their twentieth anniversary, was released April 29, 2018. Their most recent album, Note to Self, was released in July 2020.

Note-oriety as a group works for charities as well as groups promoting Women's empowerment, and has been involved with numerous philanthropic events since its founding. In 2016, Note-oriety performed at the United State of Women Summit in Washington, D.C. and in 2017 the group performed at The National Crittenton Foundation's national conference "In Solidarity We Rise: Healing, Opportunity, and Justice for Girls". In 2018, College Magazine named Note-oriety one of The 10 Female Groups Running the A Cappella World.

Discography
 Overquota (2000)
 Lights Out  (2002)
 Fusion (2005)
 Bettin' High (2007)
 Get Gone (2010)
 "Only Girl in the World" (2011)
 I'll Never Say (2012)
 "DNA" (2013)
 Note-oriety (2015)
 "Boogie Woogie/Salute" (2016)
 XX (2018)
"Fall in Line" (2019)
"God Is a Woman" (2020)
Note to Self (2020)

Awards and nominations

Musical awards

Selection for "Best of" compilation albums

Competitions

Other Awards

References 

Collegiate a cappella groups
Musical groups established in 1998